The Forum Southend-on-Sea, locally known simply as The Forum, is a library located in Southend-on-Sea, Essex, England. It was opened in September 2013 following a relocation from the former building of Southend Central Library. Membership for the library is free.

Development 
The building's construction was funded by the Southend-on-Sea Borough Council, the University of Essex and South Essex College, each putting forward £12.5 million, £10.4 million and £4 million respectively.

References

External links 
 The Forum Southend-on-Sea – official website

Libraries in Essex